This is a list of cartoons featuring Elmer Fudd, from the Warner Bros. Looney Tunes and Merrie Melodies theatrical cartoon series.

Abbreviations:
MM: Merrie Melodies
LT: Looney Tunes

Shorts featuring Elmer Fudd

1937
Little Red Walking Hood - voiced by Mel Blanc (MM, Tex Avery)

1938
The Isle of Pingo Pongo - voiced by Mel Blanc (MM, Tex Avery)
Cinderella Meets Fella - voiced by Danny Webb (MM, Tex Avery)
A Feud There Was - voiced by Mel Blanc and Roy Rogers (MM, Tex Avery)
Johnny Smith and Poker-Huntas - voiced by Mel Blanc (MM, Tex Avery)

1939
Hamateur Night - voiced by Mel Blanc (MM, Tex Avery)
A Day at the Zoo - voiced by Mel Blanc (MM, Tex Avery)
Believe It or Else - final time voiced by Danny Webb (MM, Tex Avery)

1940
Elmer's Candid Camera - with Bugs Bunny prototype - voiced by Arthur Q. Bryan (MM, Chuck Jones)
Confederate Honey (MM, Ben Hardaway, Cal Dalton and Friz Freleng)
The Hardship of Miles Standish (MM, Freleng)
A Wild Hare - second pairing of Bugs and Elmer (but in their more recognizable forms) - also, the first appearance of a finalized form of Bugs Bunny (MM, Tex Avery)
Good Night, Elmer - voiced by Mel Blanc (MM, Jones)

1941
All cartoons from 1941-1942 co-star Bugs
Elmer's Pet Rabbit (MM, Jones)
Wabbit Twouble (Clampett's fat Elmer) (MM, Avery and Bob Clampett)

1942
The Wabbit Who Came to Supper (fat) (MM, Freleng)
The Wacky Wabbit (fat) (MM, Clampett)
 Nutty News (LT, Clampett) (voice heard)
Fresh Hare (fat) (MM, Freleng)
The Hare-Brained Hypnotist (MM, Freleng)

1943
To Duck or Not to Duck - first appearance in the Looney Tunes series, also first pairing of Daffy and Elmer (LT, Jones)
A Corny Concerto (MM, Clampett)
An Itch in Time (MM, Clampett)

1944
The Old Grey Hare - with Bugs Bunny (MM, Clampett)
The Stupid Cupid - with Daffy Duck (LT, Frank Tashlin)
Stage Door Cartoon - with Bugs Bunny (MM, Freleng)

1945
All cartoons from 1945-1946 co-star Bugs
The Unruly Hare (MM, Tashlin)
Hare Tonic (LT, Jones)

1946
Hare Remover (MM, Tashlin)
The Big Snooze (LT, Clampett)

1947
Easter Yeggs - with Bugs Bunny (LT, Robert McKimson)
A Pest in the House - with Daffy Duck (MM, Jones)
Slick Hare - with Bugs Bunny (MM, Freleng)

1948
What Makes Daffy Duck - with Daffy Duck (LT, Arthur Davis) 
Back Alley Oproar - first pairing with Sylvester (MM, Freleng)
Kit for Cat - with Sylvester (LT, Freleng)

1949
Wise Quackers - with Daffy Duck (LT, Freleng)
Hare Do - with Bugs Bunny (MM, Freleng)
Each Dawn I Crow (MM, Freleng)

1950
 The Scarlet Pumpernickel (LT, Jones) voiced by Mel Blanc
What's Up Doc? (LT, McKimson)
Rabbit of Seville (LT, Jones)

1951
All cartoons from 1951-1952 co-star Bugs and Daffy
Rabbit Fire (LT, Jones)

1952
Rabbit Seasoning (MM, Jones)

1953
Upswept Hare - with Bugs Bunny (MM, McKimson) 
Ant Pasted (LT, Freleng)
Duck! Rabbit, Duck! - with Bugs and Daffy (MM, Jones) 
Robot Rabbit - with Bugs Bunny (LT, Freleng)

1954
All cartoons co-star Daffy
Design For Leaving (LT, McKimson)
Quack Shot (MM, McKimson)

1955
Pests for Guests - only pairing with the Goofy Gophers (MM, Freleng) 
Beanstalk Bunny - with Bugs and Daffy (MM, Jones) 
Hare Brush - with Bugs Bunny (MM, Freleng)
This Is a Life? - with Bugs, Daffy, Granny and Yosemite Sam (MM, Freleng)
Heir-Conditioned - with Sylvester; Tweety (cameo) (LT, Freleng)

1956
Bugs' Bonnets - with Bugs Bunny (MM, Jones) 
A Star is Bored - with Bugs, Daffy, and Yosemite Sam (LT, Freleng)
Yankee Dood It - final pairing of Sylvester and Elmer (MM, Freleng)
Wideo Wabbit - with Bugs Bunny (MM, McKimson)

1957
All cartoons co-star Bugs
What's Opera, Doc? (MM, Jones)
Rabbit Romeo (MM, McKimson)

1958
Don't Axe Me - with Daffy Duck (MM, McKimson)
Pre-Hysterical Hare - with Bugs Bunny; voiced by Dave Barry (LT, McKimson)

1959
A Mutt in a Rut (LT, McKimson)

1960
Person to Bunny - final pairing with Bugs and Daffy (MM); final time voiced by Arthur Q. Bryan (MM, Freleng) 
Dog Gone People - first time voiced by Hal Smith (MM, McKimson)

1961
What's My Lion? - final time voiced by Hal Smith (LT, McKimson)

1962
Crow's Feat - no voice (MM, Freleng and Hawley Pratt)

Post-Golden Age cartoons featuring Elmer Fudd

Revival shorts

1980
Bugs Bunny's Bustin' Out All Over: "Portrait of the Artist as a Young Bunny" (segment of TV special); voiced by Mel Blanc

1991
Box-Office Bunny; first time voiced by Jeff Bergman. First theatrical "Elmer Fudd" cartoon since 1962. First pairing of Bugs and Daffy since 1964.
(Blooper) Bunny; voiced by Jeff Bergman. With Bugs Bunny, Daffy Duck, and Yosemite Sam

1992
Invasion of the Bunny Snatchers; voiced by Jeff Bergman. With Bugs Bunny, Daffy Duck, Yosemite Sam, and Porky Pig

2012
Daffy's Rhapsody; voiced by Billy West. With Daffy Duck

Others

Cameos
Any Bonds Today? (1942); fat Elmer 
Nutty News (1942); only voice is heard
A Corny Concerto (1943)
The Scarlet Pumpernickel (1950); voiced by Mel Blanc
His Hare-Raising Tale (1951)
Rabbit Rampage (1955); voiced by Arthur Q. Bryan
Bugs Bunny's Looney Christmas Tales: "Bugs Bunny's Christmas Carol" (segment of TV special) (1979); voiced by Mel Blanc
Tiny Toon Adventures (TV series) - various episodes (1990-1992); voiced by Jeff Bergman, Greg Burson and Joe Alaskey
Animaniacs (TV series) - (1995); voiced by Frank Welker
Carrotblanca (1995)
Histeria! (TV series) - "The Teddy Roosevelt Show" episode (1990s); Although unidentified, the voice actor is most likely Billy West.
 Duck Dodgers (TV series) - The Fudd (2004); voiced by Billy West.

Documentaries
 Bugs Bunny: Superstar (1975)

Compilation films
 The Bugs Bunny/Road Runner Movie (1979)
 Bugs Bunny's 3rd Movie: 1001 Rabbit Tales (1982)

TV series
 The Bugs Bunny Show
 The Looney Tunes Show

TV specials
 Daffy Duck and Porky Pig Meet the Groovie Goolies (1972)
 A Connecticut Rabbit in King Arthur’s Court (1978)
 Bugs Bunny's Valentine (1979)
 Bugs Bunny's Looney Christmas Tales (1979)
 The Bugs Bunny Mystery Special (1980)
 Bugs Bunny's Mad World of Television (1982)
 Bugs vs. Daffy: Battle of the Music Video Stars (1988)
 Happy Birthday, Bugs!: 50 Looney Years (1990)
 Bugs Bunny's Overtures to Disaster (1991)
 Bugs Bunny's Creature Features (1992)
 The 1st 13th Annual Fancy Anvil Awards Show Program Special: Live in Stereo (2002)

Live-action / animated film
 Space Jam (1996)
 Looney Tunes: Back in Action (2003)
 Space Jam A New Legacy (2021)

Direct-to-video
 Tiny Toon Adventures: How I Spent My Vacation (1992)
 Quest for Camelot Sing-A-Longs (1998)
 Looney Tunes Sing-A-Longs (1998)
 Looney Tunes: Reality Check (2003)
 Looney Tunes: Stranger Than Fiction (2003)
 Bah, Humduck! A Looney Tunes Christmas (2006)
 Looney Tunes: Rabbits Run (2015)

Webtoons
 The Matwix (2001)

References

Elmer Fudd